Anna Pniowsky (* September 4, 2006 in Winnipeg) is a Canadian actress.

Life 
Anna Pniowsky was born in Winnipeg in 2006 as the daughter of Jeff and Tracey Pniowsky.

After a first leading role alongside her younger sister Abigail Pniowsky in the horror thriller "He's Out There" by Quinn Lasher, she starred in "Light of My Life" with Casey Affleck, which premiered in February 2019 at the Berlin International Film Festival, portraying his film daughter Rag.

Filmography 
 2018: He's Out There
 2019: Light of My Life
 2019: The Hot Zone (TV series, 4 episodes)
 2020: Bad Therapy
 2019–2020: PEN15 (TV series, 10 episodes)

External links

References 

Canadian film actresses
2006 births
Living people